This article lists political parties in Ethiopia. 
Ethiopia has a multi-party parliament. The legislature was mostly dominated by the Ethiopian People's Revolutionary Democratic Front, until it was succeeded by the Prosperity Party in December 2019. The latest general election would have taken place in August 2020, but was postponed due to the COVID-19 pandemic. The most recent general election took place in 2021.

List

Parliamentary parties

Other national parties
National parties without members of parliament  include:

Other regional parties

Defunct Parties

Notes
1. In 2022, a party of the same name sent in application for a registration license, it was denied by The National Election Board of Ethiopia (NEBE) in August of the same year.

References

External links
List of registered political parties on the Ethiopian Ministry of Foreign Affairs webpage
Alphabet Soup, a 1995 list of Ethiopian parties prepared by the UN

 
Parties
Political parties
Ethiopia
Ethiopia